Spring Valley Christian Church Site is a historic site on Spring Valley Road, 0.5 miles east of Hardwick Center in Hardwick Township in Warren County, New Jersey.

The Greek Revival-style building was constructed in 1840. It was added to the National Register of Historic Places in 1997.

See also
 National Register of Historic Places listings in Warren County, New Jersey

References

19th-century churches in the United States
Churches completed in 1840
Churches in Warren County, New Jersey
Churches on the National Register of Historic Places in New Jersey
Hardwick Township, New Jersey
National Register of Historic Places in Warren County, New Jersey
New Jersey Register of Historic Places